In Judgement Of is a 1918 American silent drama film, directed by Will S. Davis. It stars Anna Q. Nilsson, Franklyn Farnum, and Herbert Standing, and was released on August 12, 1918.

Cast list
 Anna Q. Nilsson as Mary Manners
 Franklyn Farnum as Dr. John O'Neill
 Herbert Standing as Judge Brainard
 Edward Alexander as Robert Brainard
 Lydia Knott as Mrs. Manners
 Harry S. Northrup as Andrew Vail
 Spottiswoode Aitken as Mr. Manners
 Katherine Griffith as Mrs. Brainard
 Robert Dunbar as T. A. Adams

References

External links 
 
 
 

Films directed by Will S. Davis
Metro Pictures films
American silent feature films
American black-and-white films
Silent American drama films
1918 drama films
1918 films
1910s English-language films
1910s American films